In Greek mythology, Tantalus (Ancient Greek: Τάνταλος Tántalos) may refer to the following related personages:

Tantalus, king of Lydia. This first Tantalus, a son of Zeus, is the most famous. He was favored by the gods but made the fatal mistake of sacrificing his son Pelops to the Olympians, who hated human sacrifice and cannibalism. Zeus sentenced Tantalus to eternal torment in Tartarus, and the gods brought Pelops back to life.
Tantalus, son of Broteas who was killed by Agamemnon, who married his wife, Clytaemnestra.
Tantalus, son of Thyestes who was slain along with his brother Pleisthenes by their uncle Atreus.
Tantalus, one of the Niobids, children of King Amphion of Thebes and Niobe, daughter of Tantalus.

Notes

References 

 Apollodorus, The Library with an English Translation by Sir James George Frazer, F.B.A., F.R.S. in 2 Volumes, Cambridge, MA, Harvard University Press; London, William Heinemann Ltd. 1921. ISBN 0-674-99135-4. Online version at the Perseus Digital Library. Greek text available from the same website.
 Pausanias, Description of Greece with an English Translation by W.H.S. Jones, Litt.D., and H.A. Ormerod, M.A., in 4 Volumes. Cambridge, MA, Harvard University Press; London, William Heinemann Ltd. 1918. . Online version at the Perseus Digital Library
 Pausanias, Graeciae Descriptio. 3 vols. Leipzig, Teubner. 1903.  Greek text available at the Perseus Digital Library.
 Pindar, Odes translated by Diane Arnson Svarlien. 1990. Online version at the Perseus Digital Library.
 Pindar, The Odes of Pindar including the Principal Fragments with an Introduction and an English Translation by Sir John Sandys, Litt.D., FBA. Cambridge, MA., Harvard University Press; London, William Heinemann Ltd. 1937. Greek text available at the Perseus Digital Library.
 Strabo, The Geography of Strabo. Edition by H.L. Jones. Cambridge, Mass.: Harvard University Press; London: William Heinemann, Ltd. 1924. Online version at the Perseus Digital Library.
 Strabo, Geographica edited by A. Meineke. Leipzig: Teubner. 1877. Greek text available at the Perseus Digital Library.
 Tzetzes, John, Book of Histories, Book I translated by Ana Untila from the original Greek of T. Kiessling's edition of 1826. Online version at theio.com

Niobids
Theban characters in Greek mythology
Deeds of Apollo
Deeds of Artemis
Theban mythology